Draai van de Kaai is an elite men's and women's professional road bicycle racing event held annually in Roosendaal, Netherlands on the second Monday after the Tour de France. The first edition was in 1980 and since 2008 the event also includes a women's race.

Honours

Men's 

Source

Women's 

Source

References

External links

 

Men's road bicycle races
Women's road bicycle races
Cycle races in the Netherlands
Recurring sporting events established in 1980
1980 establishments in the Netherlands
Cycling in Roosendaal